The Sydney International in badminton, is an international open held in Sydney, Australia. The event is part of the Badminton World Federation's Future Series and part of the Badminton Oceania circuit.

Previous winners

Performances by nation

References

Badminton tournaments in Australia
Badmintion